Temnaspis elegans is a species of beetle in the family Megalopodidae. It is found in Taiwan.

References

External links 
 Colobaspis elegans at insectoid.info

Megalopodidae
Beetles described in 1951
Insects of Taiwan